Cloneen is a town in Dannhauser Local Municipality in the KwaZulu-Natal province of South Africa.

References

Populated places in the Dannhauser Local Municipality